Renewable energy in Palestine is a small but significant component of the national energy mix, accounting for 1.4% of energy produced in 2012. Palestine has some of the highest rate of solar water heating in the region, and there are a number of solar power projects. A number of issues confront renewable energy development; a lack of national infrastructure and the limited regulatory framework of the Oslo Accords are both barriers to investment.

Solar power

It has been estimated that solar sources have the potential to account for 13% of energy usage in the Palestinian Territories. Over half of all households in Palestine utilise solar energy heaters, although only 3% of houses depend on it as their main source. A 710kw photovoltaic plant was commissioned in September, 2014 in the vicinity of Jericho; it is the largest plant in Palestine to date. Research has indicated that, although a very high percentage of Palestinian houses are connected to the central grid, powering remote villages with small-scale photovoltaic systems would be more economically feasible than extending the grid. 

Israeli authorities seized a solar/diesel hybrid electric system from the Palestinian village of Jubbet ad-Dib in July, 2017. The system was funded by the Dutch government and installed by joint Israeli-Palestinian organisation Comet-ME, leading the Dutch Foreign Ministry to lodge a complaint. The Coordinator of Government Activities in the Territories told reporters that the solar panels were erected “without the necessary permits, and that stop work orders had previously been sent to the village authorities,” although a Haaretz report indicated that the confiscation orders were only delivered during the raid, meaning there was no chance to contest them in court. Residents of the village, located in Area C between a number of Israeli settlements, had been attempting to implement and gain approval for solar power projects since 2009.

Wind power
It has been estimated that wind energy has the potential to account for 6.6% of energy usage in the Palestinian Territories.

Biomass
About half of the Palestinian population - mainly in the rural areas, refugee camps, and Bedouins of North and South Governorates - are exposed daily to harmful emissions and other health risks from biomass burning that typically takes place in traditional stoves without adequate ventilation. The majority of individuals exposed to enhanced concentrations of pollutants are women and young children.

National policy
The Palestinian Energy Authority (PEA) published a 'General Renewable Energy Strategy' in 2012, aiming for 10% of total domestic energy production and 5% of total energy consumption to come from renewable sources by 2020.

Barriers
There are a number of barriers to development of renewable energy resources in Palestine, including regulatory issues resulting from the Israeli occupation, and this meant the government was unable to achieve its target of 25 megawatts by 2015. However, renewable energy has a large potential to reduce reliance on imported energy and address a number of social issues.

References

External links